Wan Rosdy bin Wan Ismail (born 1 October 1958) is a Malaysian politician who has served as the 14th Menteri Besar of Pahang since May 2018 and Member of the Pahang State Legislative Assembly for Jelai (MLA) since March 2004. He served as Member of the Pahang State Executive Council (EXCO) from March 2008 to May 2018. He is a member and State Chairman of Pahang of the United Malays National Organisation (UMNO), a component party of the Barisan Nasional (BN) coalition. He has also served as the Vice President of UMNO since March 2023.

Personal life
Wan Rosdy received his early education at the Clifford Primary School (1965), Sekolah Menengah Clifford and Sekolah Menengah Mahmud Raub before pursuing a Diploma in Commerce at the Institut Teknologi Mara (ITM).
He then pursued his bachelor's degree in Social Science (Political Science) at Universiti Sains Malaysia.

Married to Burhah Mohamed and has three children.

Career
Wan Rosdy began his career in the civil service as an executive with the Perak branch of the National Paddy and Rice Board (LPN) in 1985, before being appointed manager at the LPN Complex in Arau, Perlis in 1989. He has also held several posts within Bernas.

Political career
Wan Rosdy was elected as Cameron Highlands Umno division chief in 2003 has been Cameron Highlands Barisan Nasional chairperson since 2008.

In 2004, Wan Rosdy was elected as Jelai state assemblyperson and he has been serving the constituency since. He has also served as chairperson of the Pahang Orang Asli Affairs and Rural Development Committee from 2008 to 2013, before being appointed as state exco for the second term as Pahang Housing and Municipal committee chairperson in 2013.

On May 15, 2018, Wan Rosdy was sworn in as Menteri Besar after BN was reelected as the state government in the 2018 Pahang state election, replacing Adnan Yaakob who was retiring after serving in the position for 19 years. Adnan however remained as an MLA.  On 28 November 2022 after the 2022 Pahang state election resulted in a hung assembly, he was sworn in as the Menteri Besar for the second term after BN and Pakatan Harapan (PH) agreed to form the state coalition of Pahang and nominate him to be reappointed to the position. The two coalitions received the support from a total of 24 MLAs to do so, which exceeded the simple majority of at least 22 MLAs required.

Election results

Honours
  :
  Knight Companion of the Order of the Crown of Pahang (DIMP) – Dato' (2006)
  Knight Companion of the Order of Sultan Ahmad Shah of Pahang (DSAP) – Dato' (2012)
  Grand Knight of the Order of Sultan Ahmad Shah of Pahang (SSAP) – Dato' Sri (2014)
  :
  Grand Knight of the Order of the Territorial Crown (SUMW) – Datuk Seri Utama (2021)

References 

Living people
Malaysian politicians
People from Pahang
Malaysian people of Malay descent
Malaysian Muslims
1958 births